Taravata railway station is a railway station on Indore–Gwalior line under the Bhopal railway division of West Central Railway zone. This is situated at Kanja, Taravata in Guna district of the Indian state of Madhya Pradesh.

References

Railway stations in Guna district
Bhopal railway division